Christopher Hood (24 March 1943 – 20 January 2020) was a Canadian television editor, director, writer and producer. He is best known as the director and co-creator of the Degrassi franchise alongside Linda Schuyler, including the series The Kids of Degrassi Street, Degrassi Junior High, and Degrassi High, the latter two of which established the franchise's popularity and longevity.

Career 

Christopher "Kit" Hood was born in London, England in 1943, the son of Robert Hood and Eve Jennings, a writer of children's books. Hood worked as a child actor, then as a film editor with Walt Disney Productions in London. In 1969, he emigrated to Canada. In Toronto, he was a freelance editor of television commercials when he met Linda Schuyler, a grade 8 teacher-turned-filmmaker who was looking for an editor with advanced technical skills.

In 1976, they founded Playing With Time, a company which specialized in educational films and documentaries. Their first film together was Jimmy: Playing With Time, a documentary about a marathon pianist. That was followed by Ida Makes a Movie, a film about an inner-city girl who wanted to make a film about cleaning up her neighbourhood. The concept for more kids-related episodes was accepted by the CBC, additional funding was procured and the result was The Kids of Degrassi Street. By 1986, they had produced 26 episodes of the show.

Playing With Time produced a number of short films and documentaries, but the majority of the company's output was the first three Degrassi series, which included The Kids Of Degrassi Street (1979–86), Degrassi Junior High (1987-89), and Degrassi High (1987–91). The series followed the lives of Toronto children, from elementary school to high school. The shows’ content focused on challenges such as teenage pregnancy, drug use, alcoholism, child abuse, bullying, deaths of parents, and peer pressure. Each series aired to considerable critical and commercial success in Canada and elsewhere, and won numerous awards.

Hood wrote and/or directed and/or produced most of the episodes and made a guest appearance in one, playing an angry parent in the 1988 episode "Censored". At the end of the last season of Degrassi High, Hood and Schuyler produced a documentary about the series called Degrassi Talks, and the 1992 TV movie School's Out!. The two split shortly after, with Schuyler founding Epitome Pictures with Stephen Stohn, leaving Hood in sole control of Playing With Time. He began operating instead under Timeless Productions, but as of July 1998, still owned the Playing With Time building and sat on the board of the non-profit PWT Foundation, which had been founded originally to support the cast of Degrassi in their future endeavors. Hood rented the building as a shelter for abused women and children, families experiencing housing crises, and refugees.

Hood did not participate in Degrassi: The Next Generation; he produced and directed a few more projects before retiring to Nova Scotia in 1998.

Personal life and death 
Hood was married to Agnes Malouf, a teacher, and had two daughters and one step-daughter. On January 20, 2020, he died of a brain aneurysm at his home in West Lawrencetown, Nova Scotia, at age 76.

In August 2021, Hood's daughter Georgia created an online petition to have the City of Toronto name the laneway behind the former Playing With Time production office after him.

Filmography
Director and/or Producer and/or Writer

Our Cultural Fabric - short film, 1978
Jimmy: Playing With Time - documentary, 1979
Ida Makes a Movie - short film, 1979
The Kids of Degrassi Street - TV series, 26 episodes, 1979-1986
Growing Up with Sandy Offenheim - documentary, 1980
Pearls in the Alphabet Soup - short film, 1980
Don’t Call Me Stupid - short film, 1980
Advice on Lice - short film, 1985
OWL/TV - TV series, Real Kids segments, 1985-1986
Danger Keep Out! - documentary short, 1987
The Kids of Degrassi Street - TV series, 59 episodes, 1987-1991
Degrassi Junior High - TV series, 1987-1989 (co-creator) 
Degrassi High - TV series, 1989-1991 (co-creator)
Degrassi Talks - documentary series, 6 episodes, 1992 
School's Out! - TV movie, 1992
X-Rated - TV movie, 1994
Road to Avonlea - TV series, director, 1 episode (A Fox Tale), 1995 
Strauss: The King of 3/4 Time - TV movie, 1995
Just a Little Red Dot - short film, 1997
Dancing on the Moon - drama, 1997

References

Works cited 

 

1943 births
2020 deaths
English emigrants to Canada
Canadian television directors
Canadian television writers
Canadian television producers
Canadian male screenwriters
Television show creators
Degrassi (franchise)
20th-century Canadian screenwriters
20th-century Canadian male writers